Rodregis Brooks (born August 30, 1978) is a former American football defensive back in the National Football League (NFL). He was selected in the seventh round (238th overall) of the 2000 NFL Draft by the Indianapolis Colts after playing college football for the University of Alabama at Birmingham. Brooks played a total of five games for the Colts in 2001 before washing out of the league.

1978 births
Living people
People from Alexander City, Alabama
Players of American football from Alabama
American football cornerbacks
UAB Blazers football players
Indianapolis Colts players